The Forças Armadas de Cabinda (FAC), or Armed Forces of Cabinda, is the armed wing of the political Cabindan nationalist group Frente para a Libertação do Enclave de Cabinda (FLEC, Front for the Liberation of the Enclave of Cabinda).

The goal of the FAC is the independence of the exclave of Cabinda from occupation by Angola.  Founded in 1969, the FAC bases its claim for Cabindan independence on the fact that Cabinda is not geographically contiguous with Angola.

Today the FLEC-FAC army, made up of civilian volunteer rebels, fights for the independence of Cabinda against the MPLA.

The FAC contends that colonial Portuguese documents prove that Cabinda is not part of Angola's administrative borders.

See also
Front for the Liberation of the Enclave of Cabinda

External links
GlobalSecurity.org file on Cabinda

Paramilitary organizations based in Angola
Separatism in Angola